This article is about the particular significance of the year 1913 to Wales and its people.

Incumbents

Archdruid of the National Eisteddfod of Wales – Dyfed

Lord Lieutenant of Anglesey – Sir Richard Henry Williams-Bulkeley, 12th Baronet  
Lord Lieutenant of Brecknockshire – Joseph Bailey, 2nd Baron Glanusk
Lord Lieutenant of Caernarvonshire – John Ernest Greaves
Lord Lieutenant of Cardiganshire – Herbert Davies-Evans
Lord Lieutenant of Carmarthenshire – Sir James Williams-Drummond, 4th Baronet (until 15 June); John William Gwynne Hughes (from 15 September)
Lord Lieutenant of Denbighshire – William Cornwallis-West    
Lord Lieutenant of Flintshire – William Glynne Charles Gladstone
Lord Lieutenant of Glamorgan – Robert Windsor-Clive, 1st Earl of Plymouth
Lord Lieutenant of Merionethshire – Sir Osmond Williams, 1st Baronet
Lord Lieutenant of Monmouthshire – Godfrey Morgan, 1st Viscount Tredegar (until 11 March) Ivor Herbert, 1st Baron Treowen (from 4 April)
Lord Lieutenant of Montgomeryshire – Sir Herbert Williams-Wynn, 7th Baronet 
Lord Lieutenant of Pembrokeshire – John Philipps, 1st Viscount St Davids 
Lord Lieutenant of Radnorshire – Powlett Milbank

Bishop of Bangor – Watkin Williams 
Bishop of Llandaff – Joshua Pritchard Hughes
Bishop of St Asaph – A. G. Edwards (later Archbishop of Wales) 
Bishop of St Davids – John Owen

Events

19 February - Suffragette arson attack on a house being built for David Lloyd George near Walton Heath Golf Club in Surrey. Emmeline Pankhurst, in a speech in Cardiff this evening, claims to have incited this and other incidents.
5 June - The last ship built at Porthmadog, Y Gestiana, is launched; on 4 October she is wrecked on her maiden voyage, on the coast of Nova Scotia.
14 June - Three years after leaving Cardiff on her fateful voyage to the Antarctic, Captain Robert Falcon Scott's ship Terra Nova returns to the port, commanded by Scott's former comrade Teddy Evans.
14 October - Senghenydd Colliery Disaster: 439 men are killed in a mining accident at Universal Colliery, Senghenydd - the worst accident in British mining history. 1913 is the peak year for coal production in Wales.
27 October - A tornado hits South Wales, killing four people.
Diplomat William Henry Hoare Vincent is knighted.
Carmarthen Farm Institute is founded - the first of its kind.
Monmouthshire Training College is founded at Caerleon, with Edward Anwyl as its first principal.
School of Mines founded at Treforest, a predecessor of the University of South Wales.

Arts and literature

Awards
National Eisteddfod of Wales - held in Abergavenny
Chair - Thomas Jacob Thomas, "Aelwyd y Cymro"
Crown - William Evans (Wil Ifan)

New books

English language
Sabine Baring-Gould - Lives of the British Saints, volume 4
W. H. Davies - Foliage
Frances Hoggan - American Negro Women During Their First Fifty Years of Freedom
Thomas Gwynn Jones - Cofiant Thomas Gee 
Sir John Morris-Jones - Welsh Grammar: Historical and Comparative 
Edward Thomas - The Happy-Go-Lucky Morgans

Welsh language
T. Gwynn Jones - Brethyn Cartref
Moelona - Teulu Bach Nantoer

Music
Robert Griffith - Llyfr Cerdd Dannau
Morfydd Llwyn Owen - Nocturne (Charles Lucas Medal)

Film
The American adaptation of Ivanhoe is filmed at Chepstow Castle.

Sport
Boxing
2 June - Bill Beynon wins the British and Empire bantamweight championship.
Rugby Union
18 January - Wales are defeated 12–0 by England in a game played at the National Stadium, Cardiff

Births
7 March – E. Gwyndaf Evans, poet and archdruid (died 1986) 
13 March – Tessie O'Shea, entertainer and actress (d. 1995)
29 March - R. S. Thomas, poet (d. 2000)
31 March - Dai Rees, golfer (died 1983)
8 May - Tom Rees, Wales international rugby player (d. 1991)
27 May - Mervyn Stockwood, Anglican bishop (d. 1995)
5 June - Moelwyn Merchant, poet and novelist (d. 1997) 
15 June - Sir James Hamlyn Williams-Drummond, Lord Lieutenant of Carmarthenshire, 56
6 July - Gwyn Thomas, author (died 1981)
23 July - Michael Foot, politician, MP for Ebbw Vale 1960-1992 (died 2010)
7 September - William "Wendy" Davis, Wales international rugby player (d. 2002)
2 October - Vivian Ridler, printer (died 2009) 
18 December - Eddie Morgan, Wales international rugby player (d. 1978)

Deaths
4 February - Tom Williams, Wales international rugby player and sports administrator, c.52
8 February - James Webb, Wales rugby international, 50
16 February (in Australia) - Lewis Thomas, colliery proprietor and politician, 80
11 March - Godfrey Charles Morgan, 1st Viscount Tredegar, British Army officer, politician and philanthropist, 81 
19 March - John Thomas (Pencerdd Gwalia), harpist, 87
30 March - Sidney Herbert, 14th Earl of Pembroke, politician, 60
3 April (in London) - Henry Matthews, 1st Viscount Llandaff, politician, 87
15 April - William Jones, Victoria Cross recipient, c.73
4 June (in London) - Stuart Rendel, 1st Baron Rendel, politician, 78
24 July - Hugh Brython Hughes, children's author, 65
17 August - Harry Bowen, Wales international rugby player, 49
22 September - Emmeline Lewis Lloyd, alpine mountaineer, 85
c. 8 October - John Jones (Coch Bach y Bala), notorious criminal, c.59
6 November - Sir William Henry Preece, electrical engineer, 79 
7 November (in Broadstone, Dorset) - Alfred Russel Wallace, scientist, 90
19 December (in South Africa) - Bert Gould, Wales international rugby player, 43
date unknown - Thomas Thomas (apTommas), harpist and younger brother of John Thomas, 82/3

References